Since the inception of the Hong Kong Premier League in 2014, 30 players have scored three goals (a hat-trick) or more in a single match. The first player to achieve the feat was Itaparica, who scored three times for South China in a 4–1 victory over Rangers.

Hat-tricks

Note: The results column shows the scorer's team score first. Teams in bold are home teams.

 4 Player scored 4 goals
 5 Player scored 5 goals

Notes

Multiple hat-tricks

The following table lists the minimum number of hat-tricks scored by players who have scored two or more hat-tricks.

Players in bold  are still active in the Hong Kong Premier League.

Hat-tricks by nationality
The following table lists the number of hat-tricks scored by players from a single nation.

References

Hong Kong Premier League
Hong Kong Premier League